Sione Talikavili Vatuvei (born 14 March 1983), also known by his middle name Talikavili or Kavili, is a Tongan-born Japanese rugby union footballer. He represented Japan at the 2003 Rugby World Cup. His preferred position is blindside flanker.

He plays in the Top League for Toyota Industries Shuttles in Kariya Aichi where he currently resides.

Vatuvei was educated at Nelson College in New Zealand between 1999 and 2001. He is the youngest brother of former Japanese Rugby union footballer Luatangi Vatuvei. He is also the cousin of former Tongan-New Zealand Rugby league player Manu Vatuvei.

References

Tongan rugby union players
Japan international rugby union players
Living people
1983 births
People from Tongatapu
Rugby union flankers
Saitama Wild Knights players
Toyota Industries Shuttles Aichi players
People educated at Nelson College
Kubota Spears Funabashi Tokyo Bay players